"Homegrown Tomatoes" is a 1981 song by Guy Clark, later included on his 1983 Better Days album.  It is one of his best-known compositions.

The song reached #42 on the US Billboard Country chart during the late summer of 1981.

The song was covered by John Denver in 1988 on his LP Higher Ground. It was also later included on Clark's 1995 compilation albums, Craftsman and his 2007 Anthology LP.

Chart history

References

External links
  
 

Songs written by Guy Clark
John Denver songs
1981 songs
1981 singles
Warner Records singles
Song recordings produced by Rodney Crowell